Káraný is a municipality and village in Prague-East District in the Central Bohemian Region of the Czech Republic. It has about 800 inhabitants.

Geography
Káraný lies at the confluence of the Elbe and Jizera rivers.

History
The village was founded in 1777.

Economy
Thank to its location, Káraný is known as a recreation area. A significant majority of the houses in the village are cottages of residents of Prague and other larger towns nearby.

Since 1914 Káraný has supplied Prague with drinking water. Its water treatment facility on right bank of the Elbe is one of three major sources of drinking water for Prague.

In 2010–2012, a small hydroelectric power plant was built.

References

External links

 (in Czech)

Villages in Prague-East District